In Bob We Trust is a feature documentary about Father Bob Maguire directed by Lynn-Maree Milburn and Produced by Ghost Pictures Pty Ltd.

Story 

A documentary about Father Bob Maguire, a renegade Catholic Priest from Melbourne, Victoria. The documentary traces Maguire as he is forced to retire from his Parish of 38 years, St's Peter and Paul Parish in South Melbourne. The film begins in 2009 when the Archbishop of Melbourne, Archbishop Denis Hart 'invites' Fr. Bob to retire.

Crowdfunding Campaign 

In Bob We Trust was initially funded via the crowdfunding website Pozible, raising more than $30,000.

References

External links 
 Official Website - website no longer active
 IMDB Profile
 Jake Wilson review

Documentary films about Catholicism
Films about Catholic priests
Catholic Church in Australia
Films directed by Lynn-Maree Milburn